Hammer Island is a small island in the Sacramento–San Joaquin River Delta, in Contra Costa County, California, originally named Santos Island, it was changed to Hammer Island after Hans Hammer purchased the island from Mr. Santos in 1939.

References

Islands of Contra Costa County, California
Islands of the Sacramento–San Joaquin River Delta
Islands of Northern California